TNT Creek is a small tributary of Hills Creek in Lane County, in the U.S. state of Oregon.

TNT Creek was named for an incident by a United States Forest Service ranger's mule that threw off a load of trinitrotoluene (TNT) by the creek.

See also
 List of rivers of Oregon

References

Rivers of Lane County, Oregon
Rivers of Oregon